Octomeria brevifolia is a species of orchid endemic to South America (Colombia, Venezuela, the Guianas, Ecuador, Peru, Bolivia, Brazil).

References

scirpoidea
Plants described in 1837
Orchids of South America